Nicolas Fénélon Geffrard (1871–1930) was a Haitian musician best known for composing La Dessalinienne, the Haitian national anthem. The piece was adopted in 1904 to celebrate one hundred years of Haitian independence. He spent part of his career working in Europe.

Geffrard was a nephew of the general Nicolas Geffrard.

References
 Dominque-Rene De Lerma. "Black Composers in Europe: A Works List." Black Music Research Journal. Vol 10, No. 2. pg. 307

Haitian composers
National anthem writers
1871 births
1930 deaths
Male composers
19th-century composers
20th-century composers
20th-century male musicians
19th-century male musicians